July 23 - Eastern Orthodox liturgical calendar - July 25

All fixed commemorations below are celebrated on August 6 by Old Calendar.

For July 24th, Orthodox Churches on the Old Calendar commemorate the Saints listed on July 11.

Saints
 Saint Athenagoras of Athens, Apologist (c. 190)
 Saint Christina the Great Martyr (Christina of Tyre) (c. 300)
 Martyrs Capito and Hymenaeus, by the sword.
 Martyr Hermogenes, by having his teeth pulled out, dying of infection and bleeding.
 Saint Salumptinus, a Bishop of Jerusalem.
 Holy Martyrs and Passion-bearers Boris and Gleb of Russia, in holy baptism Romanus and David (1015)
 Venerable Hilarion of Tvali, Georgia (1041)

Pre-Schism Western saints
 Saints Victor, Stercatius and Antinogenes, by tradition three brothers martyred in Merida in Estremadura in Spain (304)
 Saint Vincent, a martyr in Rome outside the walls of the city, on the road to Tivoli.
 Saint Ursicinus of Sens, fourth Bishop of Sens in France and an opponent of Arianism (c. 380)
 Saint Dictinus, Bishop of Astorga in Spain (420)
 Saint Declán of Ardmore, Bishop of Ardmore in Ireland (5th century)
 Saint Lewina (Leofwynn), a Briton and virgin-martyr venerated in Seaford in Sussex, England (5th century)
 Saint Menefrida, patron-saint of Tredresick in Cornwall (5th century)
 Saint Nissen, abbot of Montgarth (Mountgarret) Abbey in Wexford, Ireland.
 Saint Godo (Gaon), born in Verdun, a nephew of St Wandrille, he became a monk at Fontenelle Abbey, later founding the monastery of Oye, near Sezanne-en-Brie (c. 690)
 Saints Wulfhad and Rufinus (Ruffin), princes of Mercia, baptised by St Chad, then put to death by their father (unconverted), at Stone in Staffordshire (7th century)
 Saint Christiana, by tradition born in England, she lived a holy life in Flanders and is the patron saint of Termonde in Belgium (7th century)
 Saint Sigolena of Albi (Segoulème), a nun in the convent of Troclar on the Tarn in the south of France, where she later became abbess (c. 769)
 Saint Aliprandus (Leuprandus), Abbot of St Augustine's in Pavia, Italy (8th century)
 Saint Bernulphus, Bishop of Utrecht (1054)

Post-Schism Orthodox saints
 Venerable Symeon the Newly-Revealed (born 1042)
 Venerable Polycarp of the Kiev Caves, Archimandrite (1182)
 Venerable Pachomius, Abbot, near Vologda (1479)
 New Martyr Theophilus of Zakynthos, burnt alive in Chios (1635)
 Venerable Bogolep, child schemamonk, of Cherny Yar (Black Ravine), near Astrakhan (1654 or 1667) 
 New Martyr Athanasius of Kios in Bithynia, beheaded in Constantinople (1670)
 Saint George (Konissky), Bishop of Mogilev (1795)

New martyrs and confessors
 17 New Martyrs of Mgarsk Monastery, Poltava (1919): 
 Abbot Ambrose; 
 Hieromonks Arcadius, Ioannicius, Jonah, Joseph, Nicanor, Athanasius, Theophan, Serapion, Nicostratus, and Julian;
 Monks Ioannicius, Herman, Nazarius, Parthenius, Potapius, and Dorymedon.
 New Hieromartyr Alpheus, Deacon (1937)
 New Hiero-confessor Nicholas Pongelsky, Priest (1942)
 New Hiero-confessor John Kalinin, Priest, of Olenevka (1951)

Other commemorations
 Repose of Blessed Monk Tikhon of Turukhan, on the Yenisei River in Siberia (1682)
 Uncovering of the relics (1994) of Venerable Dalmatus, Abbot and founder of the Dormition Monastery in Siberia (1697)

Icon gallery

Notes

References

Sources
 July 24/August 6. Orthodox Calendar (PRAVOSLAVIE.RU).
 August 6 / July 24. HOLY TRINITY RUSSIAN ORTHODOX CHURCH (A parish of the Patriarchate of Moscow).
 July 24. OCA - The Lives of the Saints.
 July 24. The Year of Our Salvation - Holy Transfiguration Monastery, Brookline, Massachusetts. 
 The Autonomous Orthodox Metropolia of Western Europe and the Americas (ROCOR). St. Hilarion Calendar of Saints for the year of our Lord 2004. St. Hilarion Press (Austin, TX). p. 54.
 The Twenty-Fourth Day of the Month of July. Orthodoxy in China.
 July 24. Latin Saints of the Orthodox Patriarchate of Rome.
 The Roman Martyrology. Transl. by the Archbishop of Baltimore. Last Edition, According to the Copy Printed at Rome in 1914. Revised Edition, with the Imprimatur of His Eminence Cardinal Gibbons. Baltimore: John Murphy Company, 1916. pp. 218–219.
 Rev. Richard Stanton. A Menology of England and Wales, or, Brief Memorials of the Ancient British and English Saints Arranged According to the Calendar, Together with the Martyrs of the 16th and 17th Centuries. London: Burns & Oates, 1892. pp. 353–357.

 Greek Sources
 Great Synaxaristes:  24 ΙΟΥΛΙΟΥ. ΜΕΓΑΣ ΣΥΝΑΞΑΡΙΣΤΗΣ.
  Συναξαριστής. 24 Ιουλίου. ECCLESIA.GR. (H ΕΚΚΛΗΣΙΑ ΤΗΣ ΕΛΛΑΔΟΣ). 
  24/07/. Ορθόδοξος Συναξαριστής.

 Russian Sources
  6 августа (24 июля). Православная Энциклопедия под редакцией Патриарха Московского и всея Руси Кирилла (электронная версия). (Orthodox Encyclopedia - Pravenc.ru).
  24 июля по старому стилю / 6 августа по новому стилю. СПЖ "Союз православных журналистов". .
  24 июля (ст.ст.) 6 августа  (нов. ст.). Русская Православная Церковь Отдел внешних церковных связей. (DECR).

July in the Eastern Orthodox calendar